Daniel Petkovski (Macedonian: Даниел Петковски) (born 6 June 1993 in Sydney) is an Australian football (soccer) player.

Club career

Sydney FC
Petkovski joined Sydney FC's National Youth League team in 2011 after being signed from New South Wales Premier League club Marconi Stallions. At the end of the 2011–12 A-League season, the promising left-back was signed to a 2-year deal with Sydney FC along with fellow youth players Mitchell Mallia and Hagi Gligor.

Petkovski made his Sydney FC debut as a 75th-minute substitute for Fabio against cross-town rivals Western Sydney Wanderers FC in the first ever Sydney Derby which Sydney FC won 1–0, followed by two more appearances in his debut season against Central Coast Mariners and Perth Glory.

APIA Leichhardt Tigers
After being released from Sydney FC, he signed for National Premier Leagues NSW club APIA Leichhardt Tigers.

Rockdale Ilinden FC
Petkovski was a part of Rockdale Ilinden's premiership winning side in 2020 after a thirty-six year wait, He scored important goals in the 2020 season.

2015 season
In 2015, Petkovski signed for National Premier Leagues NSW club Rockdale Ilinden. Petkovski played in the FFA Cup Round of 32 match against Perth Glory then qualifying for the Round of 16 where Rockdale Ilinden was put up against A-League club Melbourne Victory.

2018 season
Petkovski played in the FFA Cup match against Sydney FC (the then FFA Cup holders and Minor Premiers from the previous A-League season) in the Round of 32. They played at home at the Ilinden Sports Centre. The match was broadcast live on Foxtel and a crowd of 4,489 packed into the Ilinden Sports Centre. Sydney FC won 4–2 in the end.

2020 season
All NPL and grassroots competitions were suspended for one month due to the impacts from the COVID-19 pandemic in Australia, effective 18 March to 14 April, and further extended until at least the end of May. The regular season re-commenced in a condensed format from 18 July, with promotion and relegation suspended.
The competition resumed on 31 July with a single round-robin format (11 matches) followed by a two-week finals series. The NPL Premier normally qualifies for the national NPL finals series, but the 2020 National Premier Leagues finals series was cancelled in July. Rockdale Ilinden finished top of the table this season on 24 points which made them qualify for the finals series. Rockdale Ilinden had Sydney Olympic in the semi-final where Rockdale Ilinden managed to defeat Olympic 3-0. Rockdale Ilinden qualified for the 2020 National Premier Leagues final where they had to face Sydney United 58 FC. Petkovski scored a very important goal to equalise the match 3-3 before extra-time.

2023 season
On the 18th of February news came out Rockdale Ilinden that club captain Daniel Petkovski departs the club via a mutual agreement between the club and player. "we wish Daniel the very best on his next journey".

Career statistics

International career

Petkovski has represented Australia at Under 20 level where he took part in the AFC U-19 Championship qualification campaign. The Young Socceroos topped their qualifying group with maximum points and will take part in the 2012 AFC U-19 Championship to be played in the United Arab Emirates in November 2012. Australia are grouped with hosts UAE, current title holders North Korea and all time championship leaders South Korea. Petkovski has been selected in the 23-man training squad named by coach Paul Okon.

References

External links
 Sydney FC profile 

1993 births
Australian people of Macedonian descent
Sydney FC players
Marconi Stallions FC players
Sydney United 58 FC players
Rockdale Ilinden FC players
Soccer players from Sydney
Living people
Association football defenders
National Premier Leagues players
Australian soccer players